Sri Dharmaloka College is a national school in the Western province of Sri Lanka, situated near the Kelaniya Temple. The school was established in 1938 at the premises of Vidyalankara Pirivena. In the 1950s, the college moved to its current location on the Kelaniya premises.

Motto 
Dharmaloka's motto is "Aloko Uda Paadee," which means "The light has come," a lyric reputed to be mentioned by the greatest philosopher Lord Buddha after he had obtained enlightenment. In this same lyric, Buddha is said to have continued "The wise has attained."

Crest 
Dharmaloka's crest is a circle which contains a symbol of an oil lamp, the school motto, and lotus petals. The lotus petals symbolize glory and success. The oil lamp symbolizes light, wisdom and glory. The motto is in the middle circle of the crest.

Flag 
Dharmaloka's flag was designed many years after the school opened. It has three columns; the middle column is yellow and the side columns are maroon. In the middle column there is the school's crest. It symbolizes the school's glory and loyalty to Dharmaloka.

History 
Sri Dharmaloka college was a Buddhist English school established in Peliyagoda in 1938 under the patronage of Vidyalankara Pirivena. It was named after Ratmalane Sri Dharmaloka Thera, who was the founder of the Vidyalankara Pirivena.
Rev. Yakkaduwe Pannarama was a scholar priest who became the head of the pirivena and later the Vice Chancellor of Kelaniya University.  When Rev. Pannarama and several other priests walked along Waragoda Road from the Pirivena in Peliyagoda to Bodhirukkharamaya in Waragoda, some Catholics of St. Paul's Convent and Girls' School were in the habit of shouting "thattayo," "sivuruhoro" and other words to humiliate them. Rev. Pannarama brought this to the notice of Sir D. B. Jayatilaka, President of the Dayaka Sabhawa, and he suggested that the pirivena must start a Buddhist school near the Catholic area as it is only through education that such persons may be corrected. So Jayatilaka and Rev Yakkaduwe founded the school. They also discussed at the Sabha meeting that even Christian children would join the school later and that education is the only way to combat ignorance.

Sri Dharmaloka college was opened in 1938 in a small building on land adjoining Vidyalankara Pirivena, and Mr. B. A. Kuruppu became its first headmaster. Sir D. B. Jayathilaka inaugurated the educational activities of the school by taking the first lessons of the first students. In 1940, Dharmaloka ushered in an era of rapid development. D. B. Dhanapala, the famous journalist, became principal of the school. At the beginning, this school possessed neither a playground nor sufficient space to set up even a volleyball court. The school building was surrounded by marsh. The road leading to the pirivena was used as a sports ground. The school gained in popularity and the following year, parents of Kelaniya rushed to get their children admitted. The size of the school building did not permit him to admit all the children who sought admission. He organized a fundraising carnival which enabled him to put up a two-storey building which could accommodate more children. The school was moved to Yasmin Walawwa premises.

The greatness of Dhanapala lay not only in his ability to teach and guide the students in educational matters, but also in his qualities as a great disciplinarian through which he imparted high moral ideals both to his students and teaching staff. During this period there were teachers of outstanding abilities such as C. M. Weeraratne, later Vice Principal of Ananda College and mathematics instructor at the University of Colombo, A. P. Jinadasa, H. L. Rathnapala, U.G.P. de Mel and Brakenridge whose impressive teaching methods influenced former Dharmaloka students who are now doctors, engineers, lawyers and more.

In 1946, Dhanapala left the school due to differences of opinion with the board of governors; most of the staff resigned with him.  The school was handed over to the government and the venue shifted to the present site. Mr. H. M. Gunasekara took over the reins of the school as the principal.

List of school principals

Notable alumni 

 S. D. A. Gunawardena - Coordination Secretary to the Prime Minister of Sri Lanka

References

External links 
Official website

Educational institutions established in 1938
National schools in Sri Lanka
Schools in Gampaha District
Buddhist universities and colleges
1938 establishments in Ceylon